The women's 400 metres hurdles event at the 2005 Asian Athletics Championships was held in Incheon, South Korea on September 2–4.

Medalists

Results

Heats

Final

External links
 Results

2005 Asian Athletics Championships
400 metres hurdles at the Asian Athletics Championships
2005 in women's athletics